The following is a list of Cypriot billionaires. It is based on an annual assessment of wealth and assets compiled and published by Forbes magazine in March every year.

2022 Cypriot billionaires
source: 2022 The World's Billionaires

2021 Cypriot billionaires
source: 2021 The World's Billionaires

2020 Cypriot billionaires
source: 2020 The World's Billionaires

2019 Cypriot billionaires

2016 Cypriot billionaires
source: 2016 Cyprus billionaires

See also
Economy of Cyprus
List of wealthiest families
List of countries by number of billionaires
List of Greeks by net worth

References

External links
Forbes The World's Billionaires by Country: Cyprus

 
billionaires by net worth
Cyprus
billionaires by net worth